Bob Syme (30 November 1924 – 19 December 1993) was an Australian rules footballer and coach in the Victorian Football League (VFL).

Player 
A fast, vigorous and fiery ruckman (he was suspended for four weeks in 1950), Syme joined Essendon in 1944.

He played in:
 Essendon's 1949 premiership team — Essendon 18.17 (125) to Carlton 6.16 (52).
 Essendon's 1950 premiership team — Essendon 13.14 (92) to North Melbourne 7.12 (54).
 Essendon's 1951 Grand Final team — Geelong 11.15 (81) to Essendon 10.10 (70).

Coach 
He retired in 1953, and went to coach in the country.

He unsuccessfully applied for Essendon's vacant Senior coaching position in 1971; the position was awarded to John Birt.

He coached Essendon Reserves from 1971 to 1973. He coached VFA club Preston in 1974; he was replaced as coach by Dick Telford six days before the start of the 1975 season.

He served on the Essendon Football Club Committee in 1953, and from 1981 to 1986.

See also
 1949 Grand Final Teams
 1950 Grand Final Teams
 1951 Grand Final Teams

Footnotes

References 
 Maplestone, M., Flying Higher: History of the Essendon Football Club 1872–1996, Essendon Football Club, (Melbourne), 1996.

External links

Essendon Football Club players
Essendon Football Club Premiership players
Preston Football Club (VFA) coaches
Australian rules footballers from Victoria (Australia)
1924 births
1993 deaths
Two-time VFL/AFL Premiership players